William Shedd may refer to:
 William Greenough Thayer Shedd, American Presbyterian theologian
 William Ambrose Shedd, American Presbyterian missionary